is a golf-based sports simulation video game developed and released by Nintendo in 1984 for the Famicom in Japan. Later the same year, it was ported to the Nintendo VS. System as VS. Golf or Stroke and Match Golf, released in arcades internationally, followed by another arcade version called VS. Ladies Golf. The original was re-released for the NES in North America in 1985, and for the Famicom Disk System in 1986 in Japan.

The game was re-released across many years for different Nintendo consoles. It was hidden in the Nintendo Switch firmware as an Easter egg as a tribute to the game's programmer, the late Satoru Iwata.

Gameplay 
The main player wears a white shirt and shoes with blue pants and uses a white ball, while the second player wears a red shirt and shoes with black pants and uses a red ball. The player selects either single stroke play or the two-player selections of doubles stroke play or match play. The player is then placed at the tee of the first of 18 holes.

In 1991, Nintendo identified the golfer as Mario in a gameplay guide book. Nintendo's Wii game Captain Rainbow identifies the golfer as Ossan, which happens to be one of the generic hero names during the development of Donkey Kong. The Game Boy conversion would feature Mario on the Western cover art, but not the Japanese version.

Development and release
In 1983, the Famicom had only three launch games, and its library would soon total seven, including Golf. Shigeru Miyamoto said he was "directly in charge of the character design and the game design", and Satoru Iwata said he was the only programmer.

Golf has been re-released on many other consoles after its release. Hudson Soft released a conversion of the game for the Japan-only PC-88 and Sharp X1 in 1985. Golf was converted to the Japan-only Family Computer Disk System on February 21, 1986. It was re-released for the Nintendo e-Reader for the Game Boy Advance in 2002. Both the NES and Game Boy versions were released on the Virtual Console. It was re-released on the Nintendo Switch in the Nintendo eShop on October 25, 2019, by Hamster Corporation as part of its Arcade Archives series.

Golf can be unlocked in the 2001 video games Dōbutsu no Mori for Nintendo 64 and Animal Crossing for GameCube. The latter supports Advance Play using a GameCube – Game Boy Advance link cable, allowing Golf to be played on a Game Boy Advance.

The game is a hidden Easter egg in the pre-4.0 firmware of the Nintendo Switch, in tribute to Satoru Iwata. Iwata was the sole programmer of Golf (as one of his first projects for Nintendo) and later became Nintendo's CEO.  It can be accessed on the Switch home menu if the system clock is set to the July 11 anniversary of Iwata's death, and then the user moves Joy-Con controllers to imitate the "Direct" action that Iwata popularized during his Nintendo Direct. This version exclusively has the option for motion controls.

Reception 

AllGame rated the Game Boy version 4 out of 5 stars.

The Famicom version yielded 2.46 million copies sold in Japan.

Legacy
Golf is the first golf video game to feature a power and accuracy bar for swinging the club, which has been used in most golf games since.

Three-dimensional versions of Golf'''s courses appear in the nine holes of Wii Sports, the "Classic" courses in Wii Sports Resort, and in Clubhouse Games: 51 Worldwide Classics.

The player-controlled character Ossan appeared in the 2008 Wii game Captain Rainbow'' where he's portrayed as a smelly middle-aged man who's terrible at golf. Players must find his lost golf club as well as help him play good again.

Notes

References

External links 

Golf at NinDB

1984 video games
Famicom Disk System games
Game Boy games
GameCube games
Golf video games
NEC PC-8801 games
Nintendo Entertainment System games
Nintendo arcade games
Nintendo games
Nintendo e-Reader games
Nintendo Switch games
Nintendo Vs. Series games
PlayChoice-10 games
Sharp X1 games
Video games developed in Japan
Virtual Console games
Virtual Console games for Nintendo 3DS
Virtual Console games for Wii U
Multiplayer and single-player video games
Video games scored by Hirokazu Tanaka
Video games scored by Koji Kondo
Video games designed by Shigeru Miyamoto
Mario Golf
Hamster Corporation games